The following lists events that happened in 1934 in Iceland.

Incumbents
Monarch - Kristján X
Prime Minister – Ásgeir Ásgeirsson, Hermann Jónasson

Events

Births
27 February – Reynir Karlsson, footballer (d. 2014)
24 March – Arnór Hannibalsson, philosopher and historian (d. 2012)
22 April – Peter Ronson, athlete (d. 2007)
5 June – Vilhjálmur Einarsson, athlete, Iceland's first ever Olympic medalist (d. 2019)
9 June – Valbjörn Þorláksson, track and field athlete (d. 2009).
12 July – Kristinn Gunnlaugsson, footballer (d. 2001)
14 August – Guðrún Katrín Þorbergsdóttir, First Lady of Iceland (d. 1998)
23 August – Helgi Björgvinsson, footballer
18 September – Sveinn Einarsson, theatre director

Full date missing
Bjarni Jónsson, painter (d. 2008)

Deaths

30 March – Finnur Jónsson, philologist (b. 1858)

References

 
1930s in Iceland
Iceland
Iceland
Years of the 20th century in Iceland